Tourmalin's Time Cheques is a novel by F. Anstey published in 1891.

Plot summary
Tourmalin's Time Cheques is a novel in which Tourmalin deposits his shipboard hours in a Time Bank, which he can reclaim when needed.

Reception
Dave Langford reviewed Tourmalin's Time Cheques for White Dwarf #87, and stated that "Antsey can only resolve things by a hoary literary device [...] Otherwise, it's still fun."

Reviews
Review by Agatha Taormina (1987) in Fantasy Review, April 1987
Review by Don D'Ammassa (1987) in Science Fiction Chronicle, #92 May 1987
Review by Tom A. Jones (1987) in Vector 138

References

1891 novels